The 2003–04 UCLA Bruins men's basketball team represented the University of California, Los Angeles in the 2003–04 NCAA Division I men's basketball season.  The team finished 8th in the conference and lost in the first round of the Pac-10 tournament to the Washington Huskies. The 8th-place finish was worst ever for UCLA since the conference expanded to 10 teams.  The Bruins did not play in a post-season tournament.  This was the first season for head coach Ben Howland following the departure of Steve Lavin.

Roster

Schedule

|-
!colspan=9 style=|Exhibition

|-
!colspan=9 style=|Regular Season

|-
!colspan=9 style=| Pac-10 Tournament

Source

References

UCLA Bruins
UCLA Bruins men's basketball seasons
NCAA
NCAA